Dominic Meier (born December 26, 1976) is a Swiss professional ice hockey defenceman. He is currently playing for the SC Bern of Switzerland's National League A.

References

External links

1976 births
Living people
SC Bern players
Swiss ice hockey defencemen
People from Chur
Sportspeople from Graubünden